Tarrawingee railway station is a closed railway station of the closed Bright railway line in Victoria, Australia. The station closed to all traffic on 31 July 1977.

A station sign board and shelter have been erected at Tarrawingee as part of the rail trail project, as a reminder of the former station.

References

Disused railway stations in Victoria (Australia)